Piscop is a commune in the Val-d'Oise department in Île-de-France in northern France.

Notable people
Ambroise Roux (1921-1999), CEO of Compagnie générale d'électricité (later known as Alcatel) from 1970 to 1981, was born in Piscop.

See also
Communes of the Val-d'Oise department

References

External links

Association of Mayors of the Val d'Oise 

Communes of Val-d'Oise